Sun Junjie (born 8 August 1985) is a Chinese badminton player.

Career 
Sun Junjie came from the badminton family. His mother was a member of the Jiangsu provincial team, and his father Sun Zhian, was a Jiangsu coach. He started practicing badminton at the age of ten for losing his weight. In 2002, he entered the national second team, participated at the Asian and World Junior Championships, winning a boys' team bronze medal in Asia, boys' doubles bronze and mixed team gold at the World Junior Championships.

Sun entered the national first team in 2004. He was selected to join the Badminton Branch of Federation University Sports of China competed at the 2008 World University Badminton Championships held in Braga, Portugal, helped the team clinch the gold medal, also won the bronze medals in the men's and mixed doubles event.

He was part of the national team that won the men's team gold medal at the 2009 East Asian Games in Hong Kong, and also the 2009 Sudirman Cup in Guangzhou.

Achievements

World Junior Championships 
Boys' doubles

BWF Superseries 
The BWF Superseries, launched on December 14, 2006 and implemented in 2007, is a series of elite badminton tournaments, sanctioned by Badminton World Federation (BWF). BWF Superseries has two level such as Superseries and Superseries Premier. A season of Superseries features twelve tournaments around the world, which introduced since 2011, with successful players invited to the Superseries Finals held at the year end.

Men's doubles

  BWF Superseries Finals tournament
  BWF Superseries Premier tournament
  BWF Superseries tournament

IBF International 
Mixed doubles

References

External links 
 

1985 births
Living people
Badminton players from Jiangsu
Chinese male badminton players